This is a list of tombstone vice admirals in the United States Coast Guard. A tombstone promotion transferred an officer to the retired list with the rank and sometimes the pay of the next higher grade. More than a dozen rear admirals received tombstone promotions to vice admiral when they retired, for either completing 40 years of service or being specially commended for performance of duty in actual combat before the end of World War II. Tombstone promotions for years of service ended on November 1, 1949, and for combat citations on November 1, 1959.

List of U.S. Coast Guard tombstone vice admirals

A tombstone vice admiral's date of rank was the date he retired. The Coast Guard made no distinction on the retired list between tombstone vice admirals and vice admirals who achieved that rank before retiring, unlike the Navy, which gave precedence to retired officers who had served on active duty in a grade over those who only received a tombstone promotion to that grade.

Forty years of service

From 1923 to 1949, Coast Guard officers could retire with the rank and retired pay of the next higher grade if they had at least 40 years of service, including time as a cadet, although the retired pay for a vice admiral was the same as for a rear admiral (upper half).

The promotion was meant as an incentive for officers to complete a full 40-year career in the Coast Guard, which was so small in 1923 that its only flag officer was the commandant of the Coast Guard. Even the commandant held only the ex officio rank of rear admiral and reverted to his permanent grade of captain upon leaving office, so a tombstone promotion was the only way Coast Guard officers could retire with the same rank and pay as line officers with comparable length of service in the much larger Navy. A similar incentive had long been offered to Navy staff corps officers, who could retire in the grade of commodore after 40 years.

The first two commandants to retire after 1923 each had more than 40 years of service but did not receive tombstone promotions to vice admiral because that grade did not exist in the Coast Guard until March 1942, when the incumbent commandant, Russell R. Waesche, was promoted to temporary vice admiral. On July 1, 1946, Lloyd T. Chalker became the second Coast Guard officer to achieve three-star rank when he retired as a vice admiral after more than 40 years of service. Former commandant Harry G. Hamlet and former assistant commandant Leon C. Covell had both retired before the vice admiral grade was established, and subsequently received tombstone promotions to that grade, ranking from their retirement dates.

Flag grades were established in the Coast Guard in 1947, giving its officers the same promotion opportunities as their Navy counterparts, so Congress repealed the tombstone promotion for years of service, effective November 1, 1949. Even after that date, Wilfrid N. Derby and Joseph E. Stika were still able to retire as vice admirals because they had already accumulated 40 years of service prior to the repeal.

Combat citations before the end of World War II

From 1942 to 1959, officers of the maritime services—Navy, Marine Corps, Coast Guard, and Coast and Geodetic Survey—could retire with the rank but not the pay of the next higher grade, if they were specially commended for the performance of duty in actual combat before the end of World War II.

The Coast Guard claimed that a tombstone promotion for combat citations was a two-step process that first placed an officer on the retired list in his final active-duty rank, and then advanced him to a higher grade on the retired list; whereas a tombstone promotion for years of service placed an officer on the retired list directly in the higher grade, a distinction that justified the retired pay of the higher grade for the second type of tombstone promotion, which was only available in the Coast Guard.

Tombstone promotions for combat citations were halted on November 1, 1959.

Legislative history
The following list of Congressional legislation includes all acts of Congress pertaining to appointments to the grade of vice admiral in the United States Coast Guard before 1960.

Each entry lists an act of Congress, its citation in the United States Statutes at Large, and a summary of the act's relevance.

See also
Vice admiral (United States)
List of United States Coast Guard vice admirals
List of United States Navy tombstone vice admirals
List of United States Marine Corps tombstone lieutenant generals

Notes

United States Coast Guard admirals